Remember may refer to:

Film and television
 Remember?, a 1939 film starring Robert Taylor and Greer Garson
 Remember (1926 film), an American silent drama film
 Remember (2015 film), a Canadian film by Atom Egoyan, starring Christopher Plummer
 Remember (2022 film), a Korean film
 "Remember" (Star Trek: Voyager), a 1996 episode of Star Trek: Voyager
 "Remember" (Desperate Housewives), a 2006 two-episode season finale of Desperate Housewives
 "Remember" (The Walking Dead), an episode of the television series The Walking Dead
 Remember (TV series), a 2015 South Korean television series

Music

Albums 
 Remember (Big Bang album), 2008
 Remember (Crystal Lewis album), 1992
 Remember (Hiroyuki Sawano album), 2019
 Remember (Mikuni Shimokawa album), 2006
 Remember (Rusted Root album), 1996
 Remember (S.E.S. album), 2017
 Remember (T-ara EP), 2016
 Remember (The Fiery Furnaces album), 2008
 Remember (Winner album), 2020
 Re:member (Ólafur Arnalds album), 2018
 Remember (The Great Adventure), by Michael Rother, 2004

Singles 
 "Remember" (Becky Hill and David Guetta song), 2021
 "Remember" (Disturbed song), 2002
 "Remember" (Fayray song), 2002
 "Remember" (Flow song), 2006
 "Remember" (Gryffin and Zohara song), 2019
 "Remember" (High and Mighty Color song), 2008
 "Remember" (Irving Berlin song), 1925
 "Remember" (John Lennon song), 1970
 "Remember" (Pink Lady song), 1980
 "Remember" (Steve Angello song), 2015
 "Remember (Sha-La-La-La)", by Bay City Rollers, 1973
 "Remember (The First Time)", by Eric Gable, 1989
 "Remember (Walking in the Sand)", by The Shangri-Las, 1964
 "Remember", by Bryan Adams from Bryan Adams, 1980
 "Remember", by BT, 1996
 "Remember", by Earshot, 2014
 "Remember", by Free from Fire and Water, 1970
 "Remember", by JJ Lin from Stories Untold (album), 2019
 "Remember", by Josh Groban and Tanja Tzarovska from the film Troy, 2004
 "Remember", by Meghan Trainor from I'll Sing with You, 2011
 "Remember", by Seinabo Sey from I'm a Dream, 2018
 "Remember", by Ten Mile Tide, 2001
 "Remember", by The Jimi Hendrix Experience from Are You Experienced, 1967
 "Remember", by The Underdog Project, 2004

People
 Remember Baker (1737–1775), American company captain of the Green Mountain Boys
 Remember L. H. Lord (1864-1938), American businessman and politician

Other uses
 "Remember", a sonnet by Christina Rossetti
 Remember, a fantasy novella by Mateiu Caragiale

See also
 
 
 Recall (disambiguation)
 Remembrance (disambiguation)